Brampton Fire and Emergency Services provides fire protection, technical rescue services, hazardous materials response, and first responder emergency medical assistance to the City of Brampton in the Peel Region of Ontario, Canada. It operates thirteen fire halls and coordinates with other emergency services in Peel Region and the Greater Toronto Area:

 Mississauga Fire and Rescue
 Toronto Fire Services
 Caledon Fire Department
 Vaughan Fire Rescue

Operations

Fire Stations and Apparatus
Mississauga, Brampton, and Caledon underwent a region-wide renumbering of stations and apparatus in the 1990s. Each station is assigned a 3 digit number and each apparatus is given an alpha-numeric callsign corresponding with the station number. The alphabetic prefix identifies the type of apparatus, the first numerical digit identifies the municipality, and the remaining two numerical digits identify the station. The municipality identifiers are '1' for Mississauga, '2' for Brampton, and '3' for Caledon.

For example, Station 201 would be Brampton's no. 1 station and P201 would be a pumper assigned to it, and so on. Spare apparatus (for Mississauga and Brampton) would be numbered with a 5 as the second numerical digit in the number (P251, A254, etc.).

A list of fire halls and locations and current apparatus as of April 2019:

See also
 Peel Regional Police
 Peel Regional Paramedic Services

References

External links
Official web site
Brampton Fire Live Audio Feed

Municipal government of Brampton
Fire departments in Ontario